Dang Seong-jeung (born 4 January 1966) is a retired South Korean footballer and coach. On 29 November 2012, he was appointed manager of Daegu FC.

References

External links 

1966 births
Living people
Association football midfielders
South Korean footballers
South Korean football managers
FC Seoul players
Daegu FC managers
K League 1 players